Hyperprolactinemic SAHA syndrome is a cutaneous condition characterized by lateral hairiness, oligomenorrhea, and sometimes acne, seborrhea, FAGA I, and even galactorrhea.

See also 
 SAHA syndrome
 List of cutaneous conditions

References 

Endocrine-related cutaneous conditions
Syndromes